Ensemble Denada or Norske Store Orkester (initiated 2000 in Oslo, Norway as 'Norske Store Orkester') is a Norwegian miniature big band run by "Østnorsk jazzsenter".

Biography 
Ensemble Denada comprises about fifteen musicians, and has a Nordic profile through choice of music and its lineup. It has been led by Frank Brodahl and Helge Sunde (2005–). For the 2002 «Storbandfestivalen» they performed the works of Frode Fjellheim and Daniel Bingert.

In 2003 the ensemble performed a commissioned work by Olga Konkova at the Oslo Jazzfestival. For the «Vinterjazz» 2005, they performed works of their own Helge Sunde.

For the 2015 Kongsberg Jazz Festival they performed music by and with vocalist Mari Kvien Brunvoll. Her electronic compositions were adapted and arranged for a broader lineup by Erik Johannessen and Lars Horntveth, in addition to compositions by Helge Sunde.

Band members 
Current members
Vocal/electronics: Mari Kvien Brunvoll
Trumpet: Frank Brodahl, Marius Haltli, Anders Eriksson
Soprano saxophone: André Roligheten
Alt saxophone, flute: Børge-Are Halvorsen
Tenor saxophone, bass clarinet: Atle Nymo
Bass saxophone, contra-alto clarinet, tubax: Nils Jansen
Trombone: Even Kruse Skatrud, Erik Johannessen, Helge Sunde (musical director)
Guitar: Jens Thoresen
Piano: Olga Konkova
Bass: Mats Eilertsen
Drums: Håkon Mjåset Johansen

Past members
Trumpet: Eckhard Baur, Birgit Kjuus
Saxophone and woodwind: Håvard Fossum, Geir Lysne, Petter Wettre, Fredrik Øie Jensen, Frode Nymo
Trombone: Øyvind Brække, Lars Erik Gudim, Geir Arne Haugsrud
Guitar: Hallgrim Bratberg
Bass: Daniel Bingert, Steinar Raknes, Per Mathisen
Drums: Andreas Bye, Rune Arnesen

Honors 
2010: Recipient of the German Echo Award as best big band record for the album Finding Nymo (2009)

Discography 
2006: Denada (ACT), recorded in surround with Olga Konkova and Marilyn Mazur
2009: Finding Nymo (ACT).
2013: Windfall (Ocella)
2019: Live In Bremen (Jazzland Recordings) with Torun Eriksen & Erlend Skomsvoll

References 

Norwegian jazz ensembles
Big bands
ACT Music artists
2000 establishments in Norway
Musical groups established in 2000
Musical groups from Oslo
Jazzland Recordings (1997) artists